Larix gmelinii var. principis-rupprechtii, synonym Larix principis-rupprechtii, Prince Rupprecht's larch, is a variety of conifer in the genus Larix. It is native to the mountainous regions of the Shanxi and Hebei provinces of northern China.

References

gmelinii var. principis-rupprechtii
Trees of China
Flora of Northeast Asia
Deciduous conifers